Paul Christian Zamar (born October 20, 1987) is a Filipino professional basketball player for the NorthPort Batang Pier of the Philippine Basketball Association (PBA).

On January 5, 2023, while still being a restricted free agent, Zamar was traded to the NorthPort Batang Pier for Allyn Bulanadi and San Miguel's 2025 second round pick. Zamar signed a one-year contract with NorthPort on January 17.

PBA career statistics

As of the end of 2022–23 season

Season-by-season averages

|-
| align="left" | 
| align="left" | Blackwater
| 19 || 22.8 || .442 || .378 || .773 || 3.6 || 1.5 || .6 || .1 || 10.3
|-
| align="left" | 
| align="left" | San Miguel
| 23 || 7.9 || .316 || .207 || .400 || 1.3 || 1.0 || .2 || .0 || 2.1
|-
| align="left" | 
| align="left" | San Miguel
| 13 || 14.4 || .467 || .385 || .571 || 2.0 || .9 || .2 || .1 || 6.0
|-
| align="left" | 
| align="left" | San Miguel
| 16 || 7.3 || .417 || .350 || .833 || .8 || .4 || .1 || .0 || 2.6
|-
| align=left rowspan=2| 
| align=left | San Miguel
| rowspan=2|32|| rowspan=2|12.0 || rowspan=2|.439 || rowspan=2|.358 || rowspan=2|.791 || rowspan=2|1.2 || rowspan=2|1.2 || rowspan=2|.2 || rowspan=2|.1 || rowspan=2|5.0
|-
| align=left | NorthPort
|-class=sortbottom
| align="center" colspan=2 | Career
| 103 || 12.6 || .426 || .348 || .705 || 1.7 || 1.0 || .2 || .1 || 5.1

References

1987 births
Living people
ASEAN Basketball League players
Barangay Ginebra San Miguel draft picks
Basketball players from Metro Manila
Blackwater Bossing players
Filipino expatriate basketball people in Thailand
Filipino men's basketball players
NorthPort Batang Pier players
People from Mandaluyong
San Beda University alumni
San Miguel Beermen players
Shooting guards
UE Red Warriors basketball players